Dulab (also Romanized as Dūlāb and Doolab) is a village in Kezab Rural District, Khezrabad District, Saduq County, Yazd Province, Iran. At the 2006 census, its population was 139, in 37 families.

References 

Populated places in Saduq County